Richard Cross (1950–1983) was a Pulitzer prize-nominated American photojournalist who worked in Colombia, Mexico, Tanzania, and the Central American countries of Nicaragua, El Salvador, Honduras, and Guatemala.

Life and career 

Born April 1, 1950, in Kansas City, Missouri, Richard Cross graduated from Northwestern University in 1972 with a degree in journalism. After college he worked for one year as a photographer at the Daily Globe in Worthington, Minnesota, and then spent four years as a Peace Corps worker in Colombia as an audio-visual consultant and photographer.  While in Colombia he began to collaborate with anthropologist Nina de Friedemann on a project researching Afro-Colombians in Palenque de San Basilio, one of the first communities of former slaves in the Americas. Friedemann and Cross co-wrote a book based on their research entitled Ma Ngombe: guerreros y ganaderos en Palenque, published in 1979, which included over 250 of Cross's photographs.  
In 1979 Cross left Colombia to begin documenting the civil wars in the Central American countries of Nicaragua, Honduras, El Salvador, and Guatemala.  He also documented refugees from Central America who had fled into Mexico. He sold his photographs to a variety of magazines, newspapers, and news outlets including Newsweek and the Associated Press. Cross co-authored a book in 1982 with Nicaraguan priest and poet Ernesto Cardenal entitled Nicaragua: la guerra de liberación, which included dozens of his photographs. He was nominated by the Associated Press for a Pulitzer Prize for his photojournalism work in Nicaragua.

Cross enrolled in a graduate program in visual anthropology at Temple University, and in 1980 he and fellow graduate student Peter Biella took thousands of photographs of the Ilparayuko Maasai people in Tanzania for an ethnographic film, entitled Maasai Solutions. The next year Cross and Biella co-authored a book entitled Maasai Solutions: A Film About East African Dispute and Settlement.

Death and legacy 

Cross died on June 21, 1983, when he and journalist Dial Torgerson were in a car struck by a land mine in Honduras.  His photographic archive is preserved by the Tom and Ethel Bradley Center in the University Library, Special Collections and Archives at California State University, Northridge.

Publications 

 Ma Ngombe: guerreros y ganaderos en Palenque (1979)

 Maasai Solutions: A Film About East African Dispute and Settlement (1981)

 Nicaragua: la guerra de liberación (1982)

Exhibitions 

 Richard Cross: Ilparakuyo Masai Photographs. Samuel Paley Library, Temple University. September 19, 1983–October 19, 1983.
 Two Faces of War. San Diego Crafts Center/Grove Gallery, University of California, San Diego. March 26, 1986-April 26, 1986.
 Visualizing the People’s History: Richard Cross’s Images of the Central American Liberation Wars. Museum of Social Justice. August 15, 2019–January 12, 2020.
 Richard Cross: Memoria Gráfica. Museo de la Palabra y la Imagen, San Salvador, El Salvador, January 15–May 31, 2020.

References 

1950 births
1983 deaths
American photographers
Northwestern University alumni
Temple University alumni